Norwegian Metrology Service is a Norwegian government agency responsible for metrology. Its main responsibility is to ensure that all measuring equipment in Norway is trusted nationally and internationally. The agency is subordinate to the Norwegian Ministry of Trade and Industry.

Government agencies of Norway
Metrology